Carol Bolt (August 25, 1941 – November 28, 2000) was a Canadian playwright. She was a founding member and, for several years, president of the Playwrights Union of Canada.

Career
Bolt's play Buffalo Jump, an examination of Canada during the depression era of the 1930s, was performed at Theatre Passe Muraille in 1972.

Bolt's best known play, the thriller One Night Stand, was first performed in 1977, and was turned into a made-for-television film by Allan King in 1978; the film won several awards, and received mixed reviews.
 Her play Red Emma, told the story of radical anarchist Emma Goldman. Her last play was Famous, produced on stage in 1997, based on the real-life story of criminals Paul Bernardo and Karla Holmolka.

For television, Bolt's writing credits include Tales of the Klondike, two episodes of the animated children's series The Raccoons, and a single episode of Fraggle Rock.

Bolt died of complications due to liver cancer on November 28, 2000, in Toronto, Ontario. Following her death, the Canadian Authors Association renamed its CAA Award for Drama to the Carol Bolt Award in her memory; the award is now administered by the Playwrights Guild of Canada.

Works
Plays
 Buffalo Jump (1972)
 My Best Friend Is Twelve Feet High (1972)
 Cyclone Jack (1972)
 Gabe (1973)
 Pauline (1973)
 Red Emma, Queen of the Anarchists (1974)
 Shelter (1975)
 Maurice (1975)
 Finding Bumble (1975)
 One Night Stand (1977)
 Desperados (1977)
 Escape Entertainment (1981)
 Love or Money (1981)
 Famous (1997)

Books
 Drama in the Classroom (1986)

Archives 
There is a Carol Bolt fond at Library and Archives Canada. The archival reference number is R4602, former archival reference number MG31-D89. The fond covers the date range 1961 to 2000. It consists of 12.82 meters of textual records, 100 photographs and other media.

References

External links
Canadian Theatre Encyclopedia Biography
Carol Bolt fonds (R4602) at Library and Archives Canada

1941 births
2000 deaths
20th-century Canadian dramatists and playwrights
20th-century Canadian women writers
Canadian television writers
Canadian women dramatists and playwrights
Writers from Winnipeg
Canadian women television writers
20th-century Canadian screenwriters